A lesbian is a homosexual woman or girl. The word is also used for women in relation to their sexual identity or sexual behavior, regardless of sexual orientation, or as an adjective to characterize or associate nouns with female homosexuality or same-sex attraction. The concept of "lesbian" to differentiate women with a shared sexual orientation evolved in the 20th century. Throughout history, women have not had the same freedom or independence as men to pursue homosexual relationships, but neither have they met the same harsh punishment as homosexual men in some societies. Instead, lesbian relationships have often been regarded as harmless, unless a participant attempts to assert privileges traditionally enjoyed by men. As a result, little in history was documented to give an accurate description of how female homosexuality was expressed. When early sexologists in the late 19th century began to categorize and describe homosexual behavior, hampered by a lack of knowledge about homosexuality or women's sexuality, they distinguished lesbians as women who did not adhere to female gender roles. They classified them as mentally ill—a designation which has been reversed since the late 20th century in the global scientific community.

Women in homosexual relationships in Europe and the United States responded to the discrimination and repression either by hiding their personal lives, or accepting the label of outcast and creating a subculture and identity. Following World War II, during a period of social repression when governments actively persecuted homosexuals, women developed networks to socialize with and educate each other. Gaining greater economic and social freedom allowed them to determine how they could form relationships and families. With second-wave feminism and the growth of scholarship in women's history and sexuality in the late 20th century, the definition of lesbian broadened, leading to debate about the term's use. While research by Lisa M. Diamond identified sexual desire as the core component for defining lesbians, some women who engage in same-sex sexual activity may reject not only identifying as lesbians but as bisexual as well. Other women's self-identification as lesbian may not align with their sexual orientation or sexual behavior. Sexual identity is not necessarily the same as one's sexual orientation or sexual behavior, due to various reasons, such as the fear of identifying their sexual orientation in a homophobic setting.

Portrayals of lesbians in the media suggest that society at large has been simultaneously intrigued and threatened by women who challenge feminine gender roles, as well as fascinated and appalled with women who are romantically involved with other women. Women who adopt a lesbian identity share experiences that form an outlook similar to an ethnic identity: as homosexuals, they are unified by the heterosexist discrimination and potential rejection they face from their families, friends, and others as a result of homophobia. As women, they face concerns separate from men. Lesbians may encounter distinct physical or mental health concerns arising from discrimination, prejudice, and minority stress. Political conditions and social attitudes also affect the formation of lesbian relationships and families in the open.

Etymology

The word "lesbian" is the demonym of the Greek island of Lesbos, home to the 6th-century BCE poet Sappho. From various ancient writings, historians gathered that a group of young women were left in Sappho's charge for their instruction or cultural edification. Little of Sappho's poetry survives, but her remaining poetry reflects the topics she wrote about: women's daily lives, their relationships, and rituals. She focused on the beauty of women and proclaimed her love for girls. Before the mid-19th century, the word lesbian referred to any derivative or aspect of Lesbos, including a type of wine.

In Algernon Charles Swinburne's 1866 poem "Sapphics", the term lesbian appears twice but capitalized both times after twice mentioning the island of Lesbos, and so could be construed to mean 'from the island of Lesbos'. In 1875, George Saintsbury, in writing about Baudelaire's poetry, refers to his "Lesbian studies" in which he includes his poem about "the passion of Delphine" which is a poem simply about love between two women which does not mention the island of Lesbos, though the other poem alluded to, entitled "Lesbos", does. Use of the word lesbianism to describe erotic relationships between women had been documented in 1870. In 1890, the term lesbian was used in a medical dictionary as an adjective to describe tribadism (as "lesbian love"). The terms lesbian, invert and homosexual were interchangeable with sapphist and sapphism around the turn of the 20th century. The use of lesbian in medical literature became prominent; by 1925, the word was recorded as a noun to mean the female equivalent of a sodomite.

The development of medical knowledge was a significant factor in further connotations of the term lesbian. In the middle of the 19th century, medical writers attempted to establish ways to identify male homosexuality, which was considered a significant social problem in most Western societies. In categorizing behavior that indicated what was referred to as "inversion" by German sexologist Magnus Hirschfeld, researchers categorized what was normal sexual behavior for men and women, and therefore to what extent men and women varied from the "perfect male sexual type" and the "perfect female sexual type".

Far less literature focused on female homosexual behavior than on male homosexuality, as medical professionals did not consider it a significant problem. In some cases, it was not acknowledged to exist. Sexologists Richard von Krafft-Ebing from Germany and Britain's Havelock Ellis wrote some of the earliest and more enduring categorizations of female same-sex attraction, approaching it as a form of insanity (Ellis' categorization of "lesbianism" as a medical problem is now discredited). Krafft-Ebing, who considered lesbianism a neurological disease, and Ellis, who was influenced by Krafft-Ebing's writings, disagreed about whether sexual inversion was generally a lifelong condition. Ellis believed that many women who professed love for other women changed their feelings about such relationships after they had experienced marriage and a "practical life".

Ellis conceded that there were "true inverts" who would spend their lives pursuing erotic relationships with women. These were members of the "third sex" who rejected the roles of women to be subservient, feminine, and domestic. Invert described the opposite gender roles, and also the related attraction to women instead of men; since women in the Victorian period were considered unable to initiate sexual encounters, women who did so with other women were thought of as possessing masculine sexual desires.

The work of Krafft-Ebing and Ellis was widely read, and helped to create public consciousness of female homosexuality. The sexologists' claims that homosexuality was a congenital anomaly were generally well-accepted by homosexual men; it indicated that their behavior was not inspired by nor should be considered a criminal vice, as was widely acknowledged. In the absence of any other material to describe their emotions, homosexuals accepted the designation of different or perverted, and used their outlaw status to form social circles in Paris and Berlin. Lesbian began to describe elements of a subculture.

Lesbians in Western cultures in particular often classify themselves as having an identity that defines their individual sexuality, as well as their membership to a group that shares common traits. Women in many cultures throughout history have had sexual relations with other women, but they rarely were designated as part of a group of people based on whom they had physical relations with. As women have generally been political minorities in Western cultures, the added medical designation of homosexuality has been cause for the development of a subcultural identity.

Sexuality and identity

The notion that sexual activity between women is necessary to define a lesbian or lesbian relationship continues to be debated. According to feminist writer Naomi McCormick, women's sexuality is constructed by men, whose primary indicator of lesbian sexual orientation is sexual experience with other women. The same indicator is not necessary to identify a woman as heterosexual. McCormick states that emotional, mental, and ideological connections between women are as important or more so than the genital. Nonetheless, in the 1980s, a significant movement rejected the desexualization of lesbianism by cultural feminists, causing a heated controversy called the feminist sex wars. Butch and femme roles returned, although not as strictly followed as they were in the 1950s. They became a mode of chosen sexual self-expression for some women in the 1990s. Once again, women felt safer claiming to be more sexually adventurous, and sexual flexibility became more accepted.

The focus of the debate often centers on a phenomenon named by sexologist Pepper Schwartz in 1983. Schwartz found that long-term lesbian couples report having less sexual contact than heterosexual or homosexual male couples, calling this lesbian bed death. Some lesbians dispute the study's definition of sexual contact, and introduced other factors such as deeper connections existing between women that make frequent sexual relations redundant, greater sexual fluidity in women causing them to move from heterosexual to bisexual to lesbian numerous times through their lives—or reject the labels entirely. Further arguments attested that the study was flawed and misrepresented accurate sexual contact between women, or sexual contact between women has increased since 1983 as many lesbians find themselves freer to sexually express themselves.

More discussion on gender and sexual orientation identity has affected how many women label or view themselves. Most people in western culture are taught that heterosexuality is an innate quality in all people. When a woman realizes her romantic and sexual attraction to another woman, it may cause an "existential crisis"; many who go through this adopt the identity of a lesbian, challenging what society has offered in stereotypes about homosexuals, to learn how to function within a homosexual subculture. Lesbians in western cultures generally share an identity that parallels those built on ethnicity; they have a shared history and subculture, and similar experiences with discrimination which has caused many lesbians to reject heterosexual principles. This identity is unique from gay men and heterosexual women, and often creates tension with bisexual women. One point of contention are lesbians who have had sex with men, while lesbians who have never had sex with men may be referred to as "gold star lesbians". Those who have had sex with men may face ridicule from other lesbians or identity challenges with regard to defining what it means to be a lesbian.

Researchers, including social scientists, state that often behavior and identity do not match: women may label themselves heterosexual but have sexual relations with women, self-identified lesbians may have sex with men, or women may find that what they considered an immutable sexual identity has changed over time. Research by Lisa M. Diamond et al. reported that "lesbian and fluid women were more exclusive than bisexual women in their sexual behaviors" and that "lesbian women appeared to lean toward exclusively same-sex attractions and behaviors." It reported that lesbians "appeared to demonstrate a 'core' lesbian orientation."

A 2001 article on differentiating lesbians for medical studies and health research suggested identifying lesbians using the three characteristics of identity only, sexual behavior only, or both combined. The article declined to include desire or attraction as it rarely has bearing on measurable health or psychosocial issues. Researchers state that there is no standard definition of lesbian because "[t]he term has been used to describe women who have sex with women, either exclusively or in addition to sex with men (i.e., behavior); women who self-identify as lesbian (i.e., identity); and women whose sexual preference is for women (i.e., desire or attraction)" and that "[t]he lack of a standard definition of lesbian and of standard questions to assess who is lesbian has made it difficult to clearly define a population of lesbian women". How and where study samples were obtained can also affect the definition.

Female homosexuality without identity in western culture

The varied meanings of lesbian since the early 20th century have prompted some historians to revisit historic relationships between women before the wide usage of the word was defined by erotic proclivities. Discussion from historians caused further questioning of what qualifies as a lesbian relationship. As lesbian-feminists asserted, a sexual component was unnecessary in declaring oneself a lesbian if the primary and closest relationships were with women. When considering past relationships within appropriate historic context, there were times when love and sex were separate and unrelated notions. In 1989, an academic cohort named the Lesbian History Group wrote: Because of society's reluctance to admit that lesbians exist, a high degree of certainty is expected before historians or biographers are allowed to use the label. Evidence that would suffice in any other situation is inadequate here... A woman who never married, who lived with another woman, whose friends were mostly women, or
who moved in known lesbian or mixed gay circles, may well have been a lesbian. ... But this sort of evidence is not 'proof'. What our critics want is incontrovertible evidence of sexual activity between women. This is almost impossible to find.

Female sexuality is often not adequately represented in texts and documents. Until very recently, much of what has been documented about women's sexuality has been written by men, in the context of male understanding, and relevant to women's associations to men—as their wives, daughters, or mothers, for example. Often artistic representations of female sexuality suggest trends or ideas on broad scales, giving historians clues as to how widespread or accepted erotic relationships between women were.

Ancient Greece and Rome

Women in ancient Greece were sequestered with one another, and men were segregated likewise. In this homosocial environment, erotic and sexual relationships between males were common and recorded in literature, art, and philosophy. Very little was recorded about homosexual activity between Greek women. There is some speculation that similar relationships existed between women and girls — the poet Alcman used the term aitis, as the feminine form of aites — which was the official term for the younger participant in a pederastic relationship. Aristophanes, in Plato's Symposium, mentions women who are romantically attracted to other women, but uses the term trepesthai (to be focused on) instead of eros, which was applied to other erotic relationships between men, and between men and women.

Historian Nancy Rabinowitz argues that ancient Greek red vase images which portray women with their arms around another woman's waist, or leaning on a woman's shoulders can be construed as expressions of romantic desire. Much of the daily lives of women in ancient Greece is unknown, in particular their expressions of sexuality. Although men participated in pederastic relationships outside marriage, there is no clear evidence that women were allowed or encouraged to have same-sex relationships before or during marriage as long as their marital obligations were met. Women who appear on Greek pottery are depicted with affection, and in instances where women appear only with other women, their images are eroticized: bathing, touching one another, with dildos placed in and around such scenes, and sometimes with imagery also seen in depictions of heterosexual marriage or pederastic seduction. Whether this eroticism is for the viewer or an accurate representation of life is unknown. Rabinowitz writes that the lack of interest from 19th-century historians who specialized in Greek studies regarding the daily lives and sexual inclinations of women in Greece was due to their social priorities. She postulates that this lack of interest led the field to become over male-centric, and was partially responsible for the limited information available on female topics in ancient Greece.

Women in ancient Rome were similarly subject to men's definitions of sexuality. Modern scholarship indicates that men viewed female homosexuality with hostility. They considered women who engaged in sexual relations with other women to be biological oddities that would attempt to penetrate women—and sometimes men—with "monstrously enlarged" clitorises. According to scholar James Butrica, lesbianism "challenged not only the Roman male's view of himself as the exclusive giver of sexual pleasure but also the most basic foundations of Rome's male-dominated culture". No historical documentation exists of women who had other women as sex partners.

Early modern Europe

Female homosexuality did not receive the same negative response from religious or criminal authorities as male homosexuality or adultery did throughout history. Whereas sodomy between men, men and women, and men and animals was punishable by death in England, acknowledgment of sexual contact between women was nonexistent in medical and legal texts. The earliest law against female homosexuality appeared in France in 1270. In Spain, Italy, and the Holy Roman Empire, sodomy between women was included in acts considered unnatural and punishable by burning to death, although few instances are recorded of this taking place.

The earliest such execution occurred in Speier, Germany, in 1477. Forty days' penance was demanded of nuns who "rode" each other or were discovered to have touched each other's breasts. An Italian nun named Sister Benedetta Carlini was documented to have seduced many of her sisters when possessed by a Divine spirit named "Splenditello"; to end her relationships with other women, she was placed in solitary confinement for the last 40 years of her life. Female homoeroticism was so common in English literature and theater that historians suggest it was fashionable for a period during the Renaissance. Englishwoman Mary Frith has been described as lesbian in academic study.

Ideas about women's sexuality were linked to contemporary understanding of female physiology. The vagina was considered an inward version of the penis; where nature's perfection created a man, often nature was thought to be trying to right itself by prolapsing the vagina to form a penis in some women. These sex changes were later thought to be cases of hermaphrodites, and hermaphroditism became synonymous with female same-sex desire. Medical consideration of hermaphroditism depended upon measurements of the clitoris; a longer, engorged clitoris was thought to be used by women to penetrate other women. Penetration was the focus of concern in all sexual acts, and a woman who was thought to have uncontrollable desires because of her engorged clitoris was called a "tribade" (literally, one who rubs). Not only was an abnormally engorged clitoris thought to create lusts in some women that led them to masturbate, but pamphlets warning women about masturbation leading to such oversized organs were written as cautionary tales. For a while, masturbation and lesbian sex carried the same meaning.

Class distinction became linked as the fashion of female homoeroticism passed. Tribades were simultaneously considered members of the lower class trying to ruin virtuous women, and representatives of an aristocracy corrupt with debauchery. Satirical writers began to suggest that political rivals (or more often, their wives) engaged in tribadism in order to harm their reputations. Queen Anne was rumored to have a passionate relationship with Sarah Churchill, Duchess of Marlborough, her closest adviser and confidante. When Churchill was ousted as the queen's favorite, she purportedly spread allegations of the queen having affairs with her bedchamberwomen. Marie Antoinette was also the subject of such speculation for some months between 1795 and 1796.

Female husbands

Hermaphroditism appeared in medical literature enough to be considered common knowledge, although cases were rare. Homoerotic elements in literature were pervasive, specifically the masquerade of one gender for another to fool an unsuspecting woman into being seduced. Such plot devices were used in Shakespeare's Twelfth Night (1601), The Faerie Queene by Edmund Spenser in 1590, and James Shirley's The Bird in a Cage (1633). Cases during the Renaissance of women taking on male personae and going undetected for years or decades have been recorded, though whether these cases would be described as transvestism by homosexual women, or in contemporary sociology characterised as transgender, is debated and depends on the individual details of each case.

If discovered, punishments ranged from death, to time in the pillory, to being ordered never to dress as a man again. Henry Fielding wrote a pamphlet titled The Female Husband in 1746, based on the life of Mary Hamilton, who was arrested after marrying a woman while masquerading as a man, and was sentenced to public whipping and six months in jail. Similar examples were procured of Catharine Linck in Prussia in 1717, executed in 1721; Swiss Anne Grandjean married and relocated with her wife to Lyons, but was exposed by a woman with whom she had had a previous affair and sentenced to time in the stocks and prison.

Queen Christina of Sweden's tendency to dress as a man was well known during her time, and excused because of her noble birth. She was brought up as a male and there was speculation at the time that she was a hermaphrodite. Even after Christina abdicated the throne in 1654 to avoid marriage, she was known to pursue romantic relationships with women.

Some historians view cases of cross-dressing women to be manifestations of women seizing power they would naturally be unable to enjoy in feminine attire, or their way of making sense out of their desire for women. Lillian Faderman argues that Western society was threatened by women who rejected their feminine roles. Catharine Linck and other women who were accused of using dildos, such as two nuns in 16th century Spain executed for using "material instruments", were punished more severely than those who did not. Two marriages between women were recorded in Cheshire, England, in 1707 (between Hannah Wright and Anne Gaskill) and 1708 (between Ane Norton and Alice Pickford) with no comment about both parties being female. Reports of clergymen with lax standards who performed weddings—and wrote their suspicions about one member of the wedding party—continued to appear for the next century.

Outside Europe, women were able to dress as men and go undetected. Deborah Sampson fought in the American Revolution under the name Robert Shurtlieff, and pursued relationships with women. Edward De Lacy Evans was born female in Ireland, but took a male name during the voyage to Australia and lived as a man for 23 years in Victoria, marrying three times. Percy Redwood created a scandal in New Zealand in 1909 when she was found to be Amy Bock, who had married a woman from Port Molyneaux; newspapers argued whether it was a sign of insanity or an inherent character flaw.

Re-examining romantic friendships

During the 17th through 19th centuries, a woman expressing passionate love for another woman was fashionable, accepted, and encouraged. These relationships were termed romantic friendships, Boston marriages, or "sentimental friends", and were common in the U.S., Europe, and especially in England. Documentation of these relationships is possible by a large volume of letters written between women. Whether the relationship included any genital component was not a matter for public discourse, but women could form strong and exclusive bonds with each other and still be considered virtuous, innocent, and chaste; a similar relationship with a man would have destroyed a woman's reputation. In fact, these relationships were promoted as alternatives to and practice for a woman's marriage to a man.

One such relationship was between Lady Mary Wortley Montagu, who wrote to Anne Wortley in 1709: "Nobody was so entirely, so faithfully yours ... I put in your lovers, for I don't allow it possible for a man to be so sincere as I am." Similarly, English poet Anna Seward had a devoted friendship to Honora Sneyd, who was the subject of many of Seward's sonnets and poems. When Sneyd married despite Seward's protest, Seward's poems became angry. Seward continued to write about Sneyd long after her death, extolling Sneyd's beauty and their affection and friendship. As a young woman, writer and philosopher Mary Wollstonecraft was attached to a woman named Fanny Blood. Writing to another woman by whom she had recently felt betrayed, Wollstonecraft declared, "The roses will bloom when there's peace in the breast, and the prospect of living with my Fanny gladdens my heart:—You know not how I love her."

Perhaps the most famous of these romantic friendships was between Eleanor Butler and Sarah Ponsonby, nicknamed the Ladies of Llangollen. Butler and Ponsonby eloped in 1778, to the relief of Ponsonby's family (concerned about their reputation had she run away with a man) to live together in Wales for 51 years and be thought of as eccentrics. Their story was considered "the epitome of virtuous romantic friendship" and inspired poetry by Anna Seward and Henry Wadsworth Longfellow. Diarist Anne Lister, captivated by Butler and Ponsonby, recorded her affairs with women between 1817 and 1840. Some of it was written in code, detailing her sexual relationships with Marianna Belcombe and Maria Barlow. Both Lister and Eleanor Butler were considered masculine by contemporary news reports, and though there were suspicions that these relationships were sapphist in nature, they were nonetheless praised in literature.

Romantic friendships were also popular in the U.S. Enigmatic poet Emily Dickinson wrote over 300 letters and poems to Susan Gilbert, who later became her sister-in-law, and engaged in another romantic correspondence with Kate Scott Anthon. Anthon broke off their relationship the same month Dickinson entered self-imposed lifelong seclusion. Nearby in Hartford, Connecticut, African American freeborn women Addie Brown and Rebecca Primus left evidence of their passion in letters: "No kisses is like youres". In Georgia, Alice Baldy wrote to Josie Varner in 1870, "Do you know that if you touch me, or speak to me there is not a nerve of fibre in my body that does not respond with a thrill of delight?"

Around the turn of the 20th century, the development of higher education provided opportunities for women. In all-female surroundings, a culture of romantic pursuit was fostered in women's colleges. Older students mentored younger ones, called on them socially, took them to all-women dances, and sent them flowers, cards, and poems that declared their undying love for each other. These were called "smashes" or "spoons", and they were written about quite frankly in stories for girls aspiring to attend college in publications such as Ladies Home Journal, a children's magazine titled St. Nicholas, and a collection called Smith College Stories, without negative views. Enduring loyalty, devotion, and love were major components to these stories, and sexual acts beyond kissing were consistently absent.

Women who had the option of a career instead of marriage labeled themselves New Women, and took their new opportunities very seriously. Faderman calls this period "the last breath of innocence" before 1920 when characterizations of female affection were connected to sexuality, marking lesbians as a unique and often unflatteringly-portrayed group. Specifically, Faderman connects the growth of women's independence and their beginning to reject strictly prescribed roles in the Victorian era to the scientific designation of lesbianism as a type of aberrant sexual behavior.

Identity and gender role in western culture

Construction

For some women, the realization that they participated in behavior or relationships that could be categorized as lesbian caused them to deny or conceal it, such as professor Jeannette Augustus Marks at Mount Holyoke College, who lived with the college president, Mary Woolley, for 36 years. Marks discouraged young women from "abnormal" friendships and insisted happiness could only be attained with a man. Other women embraced the distinction and used their uniqueness to set themselves apart from heterosexual women and gay men.

From the 1890s to the 1930s, American heiress Natalie Clifford Barney held a weekly salon in Paris to which major artistic celebrities were invited and where lesbian topics were the focus. Combining Greek influences with contemporary French eroticism, she attempted to create an updated and idealized version of Lesbos in her salon. Her contemporaries included artist Romaine Brooks, who painted others in her circle; writers Colette, Djuna Barnes, social host Gertrude Stein, and novelist Radclyffe Hall.

Berlin had a vibrant homosexual culture in the 1920s, and about 50 clubs catered to lesbians. Die Freundin (The Girlfriend) magazine, published between 1924 and 1933, targeted lesbians. Garçonne (aka Frauenliebe (Woman Love)) was aimed at lesbians and male transvestites. These publications were controlled by men as owners, publishers, and writers. Around 1926, Selli Engler founded Die BIF – Blätter Idealer Frauenfreundschaften (The BIF – Papers on Ideal Women Friendships), the first lesbian publication owned, published and written by women. In 1928, the lesbian bar and nightclub guide Berlins lesbische Frauen (The Lesbians of Berlin) by Ruth Margarite Röllig further popularized the German capital as a center of lesbian activity. Clubs varied between large establishments that became tourist attractions, to small neighborhood cafes where local women went to meet other women. The cabaret song "Das lila Lied" ("The Lavender Song") became an anthem to the lesbians of Berlin. Although it was sometimes tolerated, homosexuality was illegal in Germany and law enforcement used permitted gatherings as an opportunity to register the names of homosexuals for future reference. Magnus Hirschfeld's Scientific-Humanitarian Committee, which promoted tolerance for homosexuals in Germany, welcomed lesbian participation, and a surge of lesbian-themed writing and political activism in the German feminist movement became evident.

In 1928, Radclyffe Hall published a novel titled The Well of Loneliness. The novel's plot centers around Stephen Gordon, a woman who identifies herself as an invert after reading Krafft-Ebing's Psychopathia Sexualis, and lives within the homosexual subculture of Paris. The novel included a foreword by Havelock Ellis and was intended to be a call for tolerance for inverts by publicizing their disadvantages and accidents of being born inverted. Hall subscribed to Ellis and Krafft-Ebing's theories and rejected Freud's theory that same-sex attraction was caused by childhood trauma and was curable. The publicity Hall received was due to unintended consequences; the novel was tried for obscenity in London, a spectacularly scandalous event described as "the crystallizing moment in the construction of a visible modern English lesbian subculture" by professor Laura Doan.

Newspaper stories frankly divulged that the book's content includes "sexual relations between Lesbian women", and photographs of Hall often accompanied details about lesbians in most major print outlets within a span of six months. Hall reflected the appearance of a "mannish" woman in the 1920s: short cropped hair, tailored suits (often with pants), and monocle that became widely recognized as a "uniform". When British women supported the war effort during the First World War, they became familiar with masculine clothing, and were considered patriotic for wearing uniforms and pants. Postwar masculinization of women's clothing became associated primarily with lesbianism.

In the United States, the 1920s was a decade of social experimentation, particularly with sex. This was heavily influenced by the writings of Sigmund Freud, who theorized that sexual desire would be sated unconsciously, despite an individual's wish to ignore it. Freud's theories were much more pervasive in the U.S. than in Europe. With the well-publicized notion that sexual acts were a part of lesbianism and their relationships, sexual experimentation was widespread. Large cities that provided a nightlife were immensely popular, and women began to seek out sexual adventure. Bisexuality became chic, particularly in America's first gay neighborhoods.

No location saw more visitors for its possibilities of homosexual nightlife than Harlem, the predominantly African American section of New York City. White "slummers" enjoyed jazz, nightclubs, and anything else they wished. Blues singers Ma Rainey, Bessie Smith, Ethel Waters, and Gladys Bentley sang about affairs with women to visitors such as Tallulah Bankhead, Beatrice Lillie, and the soon-to-be-named Joan Crawford. Homosexuals began to draw comparisons between their newly recognized minority status and that of African Americans. Among African American residents of Harlem, lesbian relationships were common and tolerated, though not overtly embraced. Some women staged lavish wedding ceremonies, even filing licenses using masculine names with New York City. Most homosexual women were married to men and participated in affairs with women regularly.

Across town, Greenwich Village also saw a growing homosexual community; both Harlem and Greenwich Village provided furnished rooms for single men and women, which was a major factor in their development as centers for homosexual communities. The tenor was different in Greenwich Village than Harlem. Bohemians—intellectuals who rejected Victorian ideals—gathered in the Village. Homosexuals were predominantly male, although figures such as poet Edna St. Vincent Millay and social host Mabel Dodge were known for their affairs with women and promotion of tolerance of homosexuality. Women in the U.S. who could not visit Harlem or live in Greenwich Village for the first time were able to visit saloons in the 1920s without being considered prostitutes. The existence of a public space for women to socialize in bars that were known to cater to lesbians "became the single most important public manifestation of the subculture for many decades", according to historian Lillian Faderman.

Great Depression
The primary component necessary to encourage lesbians to be public and seek other women was economic independence, which virtually disappeared in the 1930s with the Great Depression. Most women in the U.S. found it necessary to marry, to a "front" such as a gay man where both could pursue homosexual relationships with public discretion, or to a man who expected a traditional wife. Independent women in the 1930s were generally seen as holding jobs that men should have.

The social attitude made very small and close-knit communities in large cities that centered around bars, while simultaneously isolating women in other locales. Speaking of homosexuality in any context was socially forbidden, and women rarely discussed lesbianism even amongst themselves; they referred to openly gay people as "in the Life". Freudian psychoanalytic theory was pervasive in influencing doctors to consider homosexuality as a neurosis afflicting immature women. Homosexual subculture disappeared in Germany with the rise of the Nazis in 1933.

World War II

The onset of World War II caused a massive upheaval in people's lives as military mobilization engaged millions of men. Women were also accepted into the military in the U.S. Women's Army Corps (WACs) and U.S. Navy's Women Accepted for Volunteer Emergency Service (WAVES). Unlike processes to screen out male homosexuals, which had been in place since the creation of the American military, there were no methods to identify or screen for lesbians; they were put into place gradually during World War II. Despite common attitudes regarding women's traditional roles in the 1930s, independent and masculine women were directly recruited by the military in the 1940s, and frailty discouraged.

Some women arrived at the recruiting station in a man's suit, denied ever being in love with another woman, and were easily inducted. Sexual activity was forbidden and blue discharge was almost certain if one identified oneself as a lesbian. As women found each other, they formed into tight groups on base, socialized at service clubs, and began to use code words. Historian Allan Bérubé documented that homosexuals in the armed forces either consciously or subconsciously refused to identify themselves as homosexual or lesbian, and also never spoke about others' orientation.

The most masculine women were not necessarily common, though they were visible so they tended to attract women interested in finding other lesbians. Women had to broach the subject about their interest in other women carefully, sometimes taking days to develop a common understanding without asking or stating anything outright. Women who did not enter the military were aggressively called upon to take industrial jobs left by men, in order to continue national productivity. The increased mobility, sophistication, and independence of many women during and after the war made it possible for women to live without husbands, something that would not have been feasible under different economic and social circumstances, further shaping lesbian networks and environments.

Lesbians were not included under Paragraph 175 of the German Criminal Code, which made homosexual acts between males a crime. The United States Holocaust Memorial Museum (USHMM) stipulates that this is because women were seen as subordinate to men, and the Nazi state feared lesbians less than gay men. Many lesbians were arrested and imprisoned for "asocial" behaviour, a label which was applied to women who did not conform to the ideal Nazi image of a woman (cooking, cleaning, kitchen work, child raising, and passivity). These women were identified with an inverted black triangle. Although lesbianism was not specifically criminalized by Paragraph 175, some lesbians reclaimed the black triangle symbol as gay men reclaimed the pink triangle, and many lesbians also reclaimed the pink triangle.

Postwar

Following World War II, a nationwide movement pressed to return to pre-war society as quickly as possible in the U.S. When combined with the increasing national paranoia about communism and psychoanalytic theory that had become pervasive in medical knowledge, homosexuality became an undesired characteristic of employees working for the U.S. government in 1950. Homosexuals were thought to be vulnerable targets to blackmail, and the government purged its employment ranks of open homosexuals, beginning a widespread effort to gather intelligence about employees' private lives. State and local governments followed suit, arresting people for congregating in bars and parks, and enacting laws against cross-dressing for men and women.

The U.S. military and government conducted many interrogations, asking if women had ever had sexual relations with another woman and essentially equating even a one-time experience to a criminal identity, thereby severely delineating heterosexuals from homosexuals. In 1952, homosexuality was listed as a pathological emotional disturbance in the American Psychiatric Association's Diagnostic and Statistical Manual. The view that homosexuality was a curable sickness was widely believed in the medical community, general population, and among many lesbians themselves.

Attitudes and practices to ferret out homosexuals in public service positions extended to Australia and Canada. A section to create an offence of "gross indecency" between females was added to a bill in the United Kingdom House of Commons and passed there in 1921, but was rejected in the House of Lords, apparently because they were concerned any attention paid to sexual misconduct would also promote it.

Underground socializing 
Very little information was available about homosexuality beyond medical and psychiatric texts. Community meeting places consisted of bars that were commonly raided by police once a month on average, with those arrested exposed in newspapers. In response, eight women in San Francisco met in their living rooms in 1955 to socialize and have a safe place to dance. When they decided to make it a regular meeting, they became the first organization for lesbians in the U.S., titled the Daughters of Bilitis (DOB). The DOB began publishing a magazine titled The Ladder in 1956. Inside the front cover of every issue was their mission statement, the first of which stated was "Education of the variant". It was intended to provide women with knowledge about homosexuality—specifically relating to women and famous lesbians in history. By 1956, the term "lesbian" had such a negative meaning that the DOB refused to use it as a descriptor, choosing "variant" instead.

The DOB spread to Chicago, New York, and Los Angeles, and The Ladder was mailed to hundreds—eventually thousands—of DOB members discussing the nature of homosexuality, sometimes challenging the idea that it was a sickness, with readers offering their own reasons why they were lesbians and suggesting ways to cope with the condition or society's response to it. British lesbians followed with the publication of Arena Three beginning in 1964, with a similar mission.

Butch and femme dichotomy 

As a reflection of categories of sexuality so sharply defined by the government and society at large, early lesbian subculture developed rigid gender roles between women, particularly among the working class in the U.S. and Canada. For working class lesbians who wanted to live as homosexuals, "A functioning couple ... meant dichotomous individuals, if not male and female, then butch and femme", and the only models they had to go by were "those of the traditional female-male [roles]". Although many municipalities enacted laws against cross-dressing, some women would socialize in bars as butches: dressed in men's clothing and mirroring traditional masculine behavior. Others wore traditionally feminine clothing and assumed the role of femmes. Butch and femme modes of socialization were so integral within lesbian bars that women who refused to choose between the two would be ignored, or at least unable to date anyone, and butch women becoming romantically involved with other butch women or femmes with other femmes was unacceptable.

Butch women were not a novelty in the 1950s; even in Harlem and Greenwich Village in the 1920s some women assumed these personae. In the 1950s and 1960s, the roles were pervasive and not limited to North America: from 1940 to 1970, butch/femme bar culture flourished in Britain, though there were fewer class distinctions. They further identified members of a group that had been marginalized; women who had been rejected by most of society had an inside view of an exclusive group of people that took a high amount of knowledge to function in. Butch and femme were considered coarse by American lesbians of higher social standing during this period. Many wealthier women married to satisfy their familial obligations, and others escaped to Europe to live as expatriates.

Fiction 

Regardless of the lack of information about homosexuality in scholarly texts, another forum for learning about lesbianism was growing. A paperback book titled Women's Barracks describing a woman's experiences in the Free French Forces was published in 1950. It told of a lesbian relationship the author had witnessed. After 4.5 million copies were sold, it was consequently named in the House Select Committee on Current Pornographic Materials in 1952. Its publisher, Gold Medal Books, followed with the novel Spring Fire in 1952, which sold 1.5 million copies. Gold Medal Books was overwhelmed with mail from women writing about the subject matter, and followed with more books, creating the genre of lesbian pulp fiction.

Between 1955 and 1969, over 2,000 books were published using lesbianism as a topic, and they were sold in corner drugstores, train stations, bus stops, and newsstands all over the U.S. and Canada. Most were written by, and almost all were marketed to heterosexual men. Coded words and images were used on the covers. Instead of "lesbian", terms such as "strange", "twilight", "queer", and "third sex", were used in the titles, and cover art was invariably salacious. A handful of lesbian pulp fiction authors were women writing for lesbians, including Ann Bannon, Valerie Taylor, Paula Christian, and Vin Packer/Ann Aldrich. Bannon, who also purchased lesbian pulp fiction, later stated that women identified the material iconically by the cover art. Many of the books used cultural references: naming places, terms, describing modes of dress and other codes to isolated women. As a result, pulp fiction helped to proliferate a lesbian identity simultaneously to lesbians and heterosexual readers.

Second-wave feminism
The social rigidity of the 1950s and early 1960s encountered a backlash as social movements to improve the standing of African Americans, the poor, women, and gays all became prominent. Of the latter two, the gay rights movement and the feminist movement connected after a violent confrontation occurred in New York City in the 1969 Stonewall riots. What followed was a movement characterized by a surge of gay activism and feminist consciousness that further transformed the definition of lesbian.

The sexual revolution in the 1970s introduced the differentiation between identity and sexual behavior for women. Many women took advantage of their new social freedom to try new experiences. Women who previously identified as heterosexual tried sex with women, though many maintained their heterosexual identity. With the advent of second-wave feminism, lesbian as a political identity grew to describe a social philosophy among women, often overshadowing sexual desire as a defining trait. A militant feminist organization named Radicalesbians published a manifesto in 1970 entitled "The Woman-Identified Woman" that declared "A lesbian is the rage of all women condensed to the point of explosion".

Militant feminists expressed their disdain with an inherently sexist and patriarchal society, and concluded the most effective way to overcome sexism and attain the equality of women would be to deny men any power or pleasure from women. For women who subscribed to this philosophy—dubbing themselves lesbian-feminists—lesbian was a term chosen by women to describe any woman who dedicated her approach to social interaction and political motivation to the welfare of women. Sexual desire was not the defining characteristic of a lesbian-feminist, but rather her focus on politics. Independence from men as oppressors was a central tenet of lesbian-feminism, and many believers strove to separate themselves physically and economically from traditional male-centered culture. In the ideal society, named Lesbian Nation, "woman" and "lesbian" were interchangeable.

Although lesbian-feminism was a significant shift, not all lesbians agreed with it. Lesbian-feminism was a youth-oriented movement: its members were primarily college educated, with experience in New Left and radical causes, but they had not seen any success in persuading radical organizations to take up women's issues. Many older lesbians who had acknowledged their sexuality in more conservative times felt maintaining their ways of coping in a homophobic world was more appropriate. The Daughters of Bilitis folded in 1970 over which direction to focus on: feminism or gay rights issues.

As equality was a priority for lesbian-feminists, disparity of roles between men and women or butch and femme were viewed as patriarchal. Lesbian-feminists eschewed gender role play that had been pervasive in bars, as well as the perceived chauvinism of gay men; many lesbian-feminists refused to work with gay men, or take up their causes. Lesbians who held more essentialist views that they were born homosexual, and used the descriptor "lesbian" to define sexual attraction, often considered the separatist, angry opinions of lesbian-feminists to be detrimental to the cause of gay rights.

In 1980, poet and essayist Adrienne Rich expanded upon the political meaning of lesbian by proposing a continuum of lesbian existence based on "woman-identified experience" in her essay "Compulsory Heterosexuality and Lesbian Existence". All relationships between women, Rich proposed, have some lesbian element, regardless if they claim a lesbian identity: mothers and daughters, women who work together, and women who nurse each other, for example. Such a perception of women relating to each other connects them through time and across cultures, and Rich considered heterosexuality a condition forced upon women by men. Several years earlier, DOB founders Del Martin and Phyllis Lyon similarly relegated sexual acts as unnecessary in determining what a lesbian is, by providing their definition: "a woman whose primary erotic, psychological, emotional and social interest is in a member of her own sex, even though that interest may not be overtly expressed".

Outside western culture

Middle East

Arabic-language historical records have used various terms to describe sexual practices between women. A common one is "sahq", which refers to rubbing. Lesbian practices and identities are largely absent from the historical record. The common term to describe lesbianism in Arabic today is essentially the same term used to describe men, and thus the distinction between male and female homosexuality is to a certain extent linguistically obscured in contemporary queer discourse. Overall, the study of contemporary lesbian experience in the region is complicated by power dynamics in the postcolonial context, shaped even by what some scholars refer to as "homonationalism," the use of politicized understanding of sexual categories to advance specific national interests on the domestic and international stage.

Female homosexual behavior may be present in every culture, although the concept of a lesbian as a woman who pairs exclusively with other women is not. Attitudes about female homosexual behavior are dependent upon women's roles in each society and each culture's definition of sex. Women in the Middle East have been historically segregated from men. In the 7th and 8th centuries, some extraordinary women dressed in male attire when gender roles were less strict, but the sexual roles that accompanied European women were not associated with Islamic women. The Caliphal court in Baghdad featured women who dressed as men, including false facial hair, but they competed with other women for the attentions of men.

According to the 12th-century writings of Sharif al-Idrisi, highly intelligent women were more likely to be lesbians; their intellectual prowess put them on a more even par with men. Relations between women who lived in harems and fears of women being sexually intimate in Turkish baths were expressed in writings by men. Women were mostly silent and men likewise rarely wrote about lesbian relationships. It is unclear to historians if the rare instances of lesbianism mentioned in literature are an accurate historical record or intended to serve as fantasies for men. A 1978 treatise about repression in Iran asserted that women were completely silenced: "In the whole of Iranian history, [no woman] has been allowed to speak out for such tendencies ... To attest to lesbian desires would be an unforgivable crime."

Although the authors of Islamic Homosexualities argued this did not mean women could not engage in lesbian relationships, a lesbian anthropologist in 1991 visited Yemen and reported that women in the town she visited were unable to comprehend her romantic relationship to another woman. Women in Pakistan are expected to marry men; those who do not are ostracized. Women may have intimate relations with other women as long as their wifely duties are met, their private matters are kept quiet, and the woman with whom they are involved is somehow related by family or logical interest to her lover.

Individuals identifying with or otherwise engaging in lesbian practices in the region can face family violence and societal persecution, including what are commonly referred to as "honor killings." The justifications provided by murderers relate to a person's perceived sexual immorality, loss of virginity (outside of acceptable frames of marriage), and target female victims primarily.

Americas
Both male and female homosexuality were known in Aztec culture. Although both were generally disapproved of, there is no evidence that homosexuality was actively suppressed until after the Spanish Conquest. Female homosexuality is described in the Florentine Codex, a 16th-century study of the Aztec world written by the Spanish Franciscan friar Bernardino de Sahagún. It describes Aztec lesbians as masculine in appearance and behavior and never wishing to be married. The book Monarquía indiana by Fray Juan de Torquemada, published in 1615, briefly mentions the persecution of Aztec lesbians: "The woman, who with another woman had carnal pleasures, whom they called patlache, which is to say: female incubus; they both died for it."

In Latin America, lesbian consciousness and associations appeared in the 1970s, increasing while several countries transitioned to or reformed democratic governments. Harassment and intimidation have been common even in places where homosexuality is legal, and laws against child corruption, morality, or "the good ways" (faltas a la moral o las buenas costumbres), have been used to persecute homosexuals. From the Hispanic perspective, the conflict between the lesbophobia of some feminists and the misogyny from gay men has created a difficult path for lesbians and associated groups.

Argentina was the first Latin American country with a gay rights group, Nuestro Mundo (NM, or Our World), created in 1969. Six mostly secret organizations concentrating on gay or lesbian issues were founded around this time, but persecution and harassment were continuous and grew worse with the dictatorship of Jorge Rafael Videla in 1976, when all groups were dissolved in the Dirty War. Lesbian rights groups have gradually formed since 1986 to build a cohesive community that works to overcome philosophical differences with heterosexual women.

The Latin American lesbian movement has been the most active in Mexico, but has encountered similar problems in effectiveness and cohesion. While groups try to promote lesbian issues and concerns, they also face misogynistic attitudes from gay men and homophobic views from heterosexual women. In 1977, Lesbos, the first lesbian organization for Mexicans, was formed. Several incarnations of political groups promoting lesbian issues have evolved; 13 lesbian organizations were active in Mexico City in 1997. Ultimately, lesbian associations had little influence on the homosexual and feminist movements.

In Chile, the dictatorship of Augusto Pinochet forbade the creation of lesbian groups until 1984, when Ayuquelén ("joy of being" in Mapuche) was first founded, prompted by the very public beating death of a woman amid shouts of "Damned lesbian!" from her attacker. The lesbian movement has been closely associated with the feminist movement in Chile, although the relationship has been sometimes strained. Ayuquelén worked with the International Lesbian Information Service, the International Lesbian, Gay, Bisexual, Trans and Intersex Association, and the Chilean gay rights group Movimiento de Integración y Liberación Homosexual (Movement to Integrate and Liberate Homosexuals) to remove the sodomy law still in force in Chile.

Lesbian consciousness became more visible in Nicaragua in 1986, when the Sandinista National Liberation Front expelled gay men and lesbians from its midst. State persecution prevented the formation of associations until AIDS became a concern, when educational efforts forced sexual minorities to band together. The first lesbian organization was Nosotras, founded in 1989. An effort to promote visibility from 1991 to 1992 provoked the government to declare homosexuality illegal in 1994, effectively ending the movement, until 2004, when Grupo Safo – Grupo de Mujeres Lesbianas de Nicaragua was created, four years before homosexuality became legal again.

The meetings of feminist lesbians of Latin America and the Caribbean, sometimes shortened to "Lesbian meetings", have been an important forum for the exchange of ideas for Latin American lesbians since the late 1980s. With rotating hosts and biannual gatherings, its main aims are the creation of communication networks, to change the situation of lesbians in Latin America (both legally and socially), to increase solidarity between lesbians and to destroy the existing myths about them.

Some Indigenous peoples of the Americas conceptualize a third gender for women who dress as, and fulfill the roles usually filled by, men in their cultures. In other cases they may see gender as a spectrum, and use different terms for feminine women and masculine women. These identities are rooted in the context of the ceremonial and cultural lives of the particular Indigenous cultures, and "simply being gay and Indian does not make someone a Two-Spirit." These ceremonial and social roles, which are conferred and confirmed by the person's elders, "do not make sense" when defined by non-Native concepts of sexual orientation and gender identity. Rather, they must be understood in an Indigenous context, as traditional spiritual and social roles held by the person in their Indigenous community.

Africa
Cross-gender roles and marriage between women has also been recorded in over 30 African societies. Women may marry other women, raise their children, and be generally thought of as men in societies in Nigeria, Cameroon, and Kenya. The Hausa people of Sudan have a term equivalent to lesbian, kifi, that may also be applied to males to mean "neither party insists on a particular sexual role".

Near the Congo River, a female who participates in strong emotional or sexual relationships with another female among the Nkundo people is known as yaikya bonsángo (a woman who presses against another woman). Lesbian relationships are also known in matrilineal societies in Ghana among the Akan people. In Lesotho, females engage in what is commonly considered sexual behavior to the Western world: they kiss, sleep together, rub genitals, participate in cunnilingus, and maintain their relationships with other females vigilantly. Since the people of Lesotho believe sex requires a penis, they do not consider their behavior sexual, nor label themselves lesbians.

In Tanzania, lesbians are known as or called "Msagaji" (singular), "Wasagaji" (plural), which in Swahili means grinder or grinding because of the perceived nature of lesbian sex that would involve the mutual rubbing of vulvas.

In South Africa, lesbians are sometimes raped by heterosexual men with a goal of punishment of "abnormal" behavior and reinforcement of societal norms. The crime was first identified in South Africa where it is sometimes supervised by members of the woman's family or local community, and is a major contributor to HIV infection in South African lesbians. "Corrective rape" is not recognized by the South African legal system as a hate crime despite the fact that the South African Constitution states that no person shall be discriminated against based on their social status and identity, including sexual orientation. Legally, South Africa protects gay rights extensively, but the government has not taken proactive action to prevent corrective rape, and women do not have much faith in the police and their investigations.

Corrective rape is reported to be on the rise in South Africa. The South African nonprofit "Luleki Sizwe" estimates that more than 10 lesbians are raped or gang-raped on a weekly basis. As made public by the Triangle Project in 2008, at least 500 lesbians become victims of corrective rape every year and 86% of black lesbians in the Western Cape live in fear of being sexually assaulted. Victims of corrective rape are less likely to report the crime because of their society's negative beliefs about homosexuality.

Asia

China before westernization was another society that segregated men from women. Historical Chinese culture has not recognized a concept of sexual orientation, or a framework to divide people based on their same-sex or opposite-sex attractions. Although there was a significant culture surrounding homosexual men, there was none for women. Outside their duties to bear sons to their husbands, women were perceived as having no sexuality at all.

This did not mean that women could not pursue sexual relationships with other women, but that such associations could not impose upon women's relationships to men. Rare references to lesbianism were written by Ying Shao, who identified same-sex relationships between women in imperial courts who behaved as husband and wife as dui shi (paired eating). "Golden Orchid Associations" in Southern China existed into the 20th century and promoted formal marriages between women, who were then allowed to adopt children. Westernization brought new ideas that all sexual behavior not resulting in reproduction was aberrant.

The liberty of being employed in silk factories starting in 1865 allowed some women to style themselves tzu-shu nii (never to marry) and live in communes with other women. Other Chinese called them sou-hei (self-combers) for adopting hairstyles of married women. These communes passed because of the Great Depression and were subsequently discouraged by the communist government for being a relic of feudal China. In contemporary Chinese society, tongzhi (same goal or spirit) is the term used to refer to homosexuals; most Chinese are reluctant to divide this classification further to identify lesbians.

In Japan, the term rezubian, a Japanese pronunciation of "lesbian", was used during the 1920s. Westernization brought more independence for women and allowed some Japanese women to wear pants. The cognate tomboy is used in the Philippines, and particularly in Manila, to denote women who are more masculine. Virtuous women in Korea prioritize motherhood, chastity, and virginity; outside this scope, very few women are free to express themselves through sexuality, although there is a growing organization for lesbians named Kkirikkiri. The term pondan is used in Malaysia to refer to gay men, but since there is no historical context to reference lesbians, the term is used for female homosexuals as well. As in many Asian countries, open homosexuality is discouraged in many social levels, so many Malaysians lead double lives.

In India, a 14th-century Indian text mentioning a lesbian couple who had a child as a result of their lovemaking is an exception to the general silence about female homosexuality. According to Ruth Vanita, this invisibility disappeared with the release of a film titled Fire in 1996, prompting some theaters in India to be attacked by religious extremists. Terms used to label homosexuals are often rejected by Indian activists for being the result of imperialist influence, but most discourse on homosexuality centers on men. Women's rights groups in India continue to debate the legitimacy of including lesbian issues in their platforms, as lesbians and material focusing on female homosexuality are frequently suppressed.

Demographics

Kinsey Report

The most extensive early study of female homosexuality was provided by the Institute for Sex Research, who published an in-depth report of the sexual experiences of American women in 1953. More than 8,000 women were interviewed by Alfred Kinsey and the staff of the Institute for Sex Research in a book titled Sexual Behavior in the Human Female, popularly known as part of the Kinsey Report. The Kinsey Report's dispassionate discussion of homosexuality as a form of human sexual behavior was revolutionary. Up to this study, only physicians and psychiatrists studied sexual behavior, and almost always the results were interpreted with a moral view.

Kinsey and his staff reported that 28% of women had been aroused by another female, and 19% had a sexual contact with another female. Of women who had sexual contact with another female, half to two-thirds of them had orgasmed. Single women had the highest prevalence of homosexual activity, followed by women who were widowed, divorced, or separated. The lowest occurrence of sexual activity was among married women; those with previous homosexual experience reported they married to stop homosexual activity.

Most of the women who reported homosexual activity had not experienced it more than ten times. Fifty-one percent of women reporting homosexual experience had only one partner. Women with post-graduate education had a higher prevalence of homosexual experience, followed by women with a college education; the smallest occurrence was among women with education no higher than eighth grade. Some criticized Kinsey's methodology.

Based on Kinsey's scale where 0 represents a person with an exclusively heterosexual response and 6 represents a person with an exclusively homosexual one, and numbers in between represent a gradient of responses with both sexes, 6% of those interviewed ranked as a 6: exclusively homosexual. Apart from those who ranked 0 (71%), the largest percentage in between 0 and 6 was 1 at approximately 15%. The Kinsey Report remarked that the ranking described a period in a person's life, and that a person's orientation may change. Among the criticisms the Kinsey Report received, a particular one addressed the Institute for Sex Research's tendency to use statistical sampling, which facilitated an over-representation of same-sex relationships by other researchers who did not adhere to Kinsey's qualifications of data.

Hite Report
In 1976, sexologist Shere Hite published a report on the sexual encounters of 3,019 women who had responded to questionnaires, under the title The Hite Report. Hite's questions differed from Kinsey's, focusing more on how women identified, or what they preferred rather than experience. Respondents to Hite's questions indicated that 8% preferred sex with women and 9% answered that they identified as bisexual or had sexual experiences with men and women, though they refused to indicate preference.

Hite's conclusions are more based on respondents' comments than quantifiable data. She found it "striking" that many women who had no lesbian experiences indicated they were interested in sex with women, particularly because the question was not asked. Hite found the two most significant differences between respondents' experience with men and women were the focus on clitoral stimulation, and more emotional involvement and orgasmic responses. Since Hite performed her study during the popularity of feminism in the 1970s, she also acknowledged that women may have chosen the political identity of a lesbian.

Population estimates
Lesbians in the U.S. are estimated to be about 2.6% of the population, according to a National Opinion Research Center survey of sexually active adults who had had same-sex experiences within the past year, completed in 2000. A survey of same-sex couples in the United States showed that between 2000 and 2005, the number of people claiming to be in same-sex relationships increased by 30%—five times the rate of population growth in the U.S. The study attributed the jump to people being more comfortable self-identifying as homosexual to the federal government.

The government of the United Kingdom does not ask citizens to define their sexuality. A survey by the UK Office for National Statistics (ONS) in 2010 found that 1.5% of Britons identified themselves as gay or bisexual, and the ONS suggests that this is in line with other surveys showing the number between 0.3% and 3%. Estimates of lesbians are sometimes not differentiated in studies of same-sex households, such as those performed by the U.S. census, and estimates of total gay, lesbian, or bisexual population by the UK government. Polls in Australia recorded a range of self-identified lesbian or bisexual women from 1.3% to 2.2% of the total population.

Health

Physical
In terms of medical issues, lesbians are referred to as women who have sex with women (WSW) because of the misconceptions and assumptions about women's sexuality and some women's hesitancy to disclose their accurate sexual histories even to a physician. Many self-identified lesbians neglect to see a physician because they do not participate in heterosexual activity and require no birth control, which is the initiating factor for most women to seek consultation with a gynecologist when they become sexually active. As a result, many lesbians are not screened regularly with Pap smears. The U.S. government reports that some lesbians neglect seeking medical screening in the U.S.; they lack health insurance because many employers do not offer health benefits to domestic partners.

The result of the lack of medical information on WSW is that medical professionals and some lesbians perceive lesbians as having lower risks of acquiring sexually transmitted diseases or types of cancer. When women do seek medical attention, medical professionals often fail to take a complete medical history. In a 2006 study of 2,345 lesbian and bisexual women, only 9.3% had claimed they had ever been asked their sexual orientation by a physician. A third of the respondents believed disclosing their sexual history would result in a negative reaction, and 30% had received a negative reaction from a medical professional after identifying themselves as lesbian or bisexual. A patient's complete history helps medical professionals identify higher risk areas and corrects assumptions about the personal histories of women. In a similar survey of 6,935 lesbians, 77% had had sexual contact with one or more male partners, and 6% had that contact within the previous year.

Heart disease is listed by the U.S. Department of Health and Human Services as the number one cause of death for all women. Factors that add to risk of heart disease include obesity and smoking, both of which are more prevalent in lesbians. Studies show that lesbians have a higher body mass and are generally less concerned about weight issues than heterosexual women, and lesbians consider women with higher body masses to be more attractive than heterosexual women do. Lesbians are more likely to exercise regularly than heterosexual women, and lesbians do not generally exercise for aesthetic reasons, although heterosexual women do. Research is needed to determine specific causes of obesity in lesbians.

Lack of differentiation between homosexual and heterosexual women in medical studies that concentrate on health issues for women skews results for lesbians and non-lesbian women. Reports are inconclusive about occurrence of breast cancer in lesbians. It has been determined that the lower rate of lesbians tested by regular Pap smears makes it more difficult to detect cervical cancer at early stages in lesbians. The risk factors for developing ovarian cancer rates are higher in lesbians than heterosexual women, perhaps because many lesbians lack protective factors of pregnancy, abortion, contraceptives, breast feeding, and miscarriages.

Some sexually transmitted diseases are communicable between women, including human papillomavirus (HPV)—specifically genital warts—squamous intraepithelial lesions, trichomoniasis, syphilis, and herpes simplex virus (HSV). Transmission of specific sexually transmitted diseases among women who have sex with women depends on the sexual practices women engage in. Any object that comes in contact with cervical secretions, vaginal mucosa, or menstrual blood, including fingers or penetrative objects may transmit sexually transmitted diseases. Orogenital contact may indicate a higher risk of acquiring HSV, even among women who have had no prior sex with men.

Bacterial vaginosis (BV) occurs more often in lesbians, but it is unclear if BV is transmitted by sexual contact; it occurs in celibate as well as sexually active women. BV often occurs in both partners in a lesbian relationship; a recent study of women with BV found that 81% had partners with BV. Lesbians are not included in a category of frequency of human immunodeficiency virus (HIV) transmission, although transmission is possible through vaginal and cervical secretions. The highest rate of transmission of HIV to lesbians is among women who participate in intravenous drug use or have sexual intercourse with bisexual men.

Mental
Since medical literature began to describe homosexuality, it has often been approached from a view that sought to find an inherent psychopathology as the root cause, influenced by the theories of Sigmund Freud. Although he considered bisexuality inherent in all people, and said that most have phases of homosexual attraction or experimentation, exclusive same-sex attraction he attributed to stunted development resulting from trauma or parental conflicts. Much literature on mental health and lesbians centered on their depression, substance abuse, and suicide. Although these issues exist among lesbians, discussion about their causes shifted after homosexuality was removed from the Diagnostic and Statistical Manual in 1973. Instead, social ostracism, legal discrimination, internalization of negative stereotypes, and limited support structures indicate factors homosexuals face in Western societies that often adversely affect their mental health.

Women who identify as lesbian report feeling significantly different and isolated during adolescence. These emotions have been cited as appearing on average at 15 years old in lesbians and 18 years old in women who identify as bisexual. On the whole, women tend to work through developing a self-concept internally, or with other women with whom they are intimate. Women also limit who they divulge their sexual identities to, and more often see being lesbian as a choice, as opposed to gay men, who work more externally and see being gay as outside their control.

Anxiety disorders and depression are the most common mental health issues for women. Depression is reported among lesbians at a rate similar to heterosexual women, although generalized anxiety disorder is more likely to appear among lesbian and bisexual women than heterosexual women. Depression is a more significant problem among women who feel they must hide their sexual orientation from friends and family, or experience compounded ethnic or religious discrimination, or endure relationship difficulties with no support system. Men's shaping of women's sexuality has proven to have an effect on how lesbians see their own bodies. Studies have shown that heterosexual men and lesbians have different standards for what they consider attractive in women. Lesbians who view themselves with male standards of female beauty may experience lower self-esteem, eating disorders, and higher incidence of depression. More than half the respondents to a 1994 survey of health issues in lesbians reported they had suicidal thoughts, and 18% had attempted suicide.

A population-based study completed by the National Alcohol Research Center found that women who identify as lesbian or bisexual are less likely to abstain from alcohol. Lesbians and bisexual women have a higher likelihood of reporting problems with alcohol, as well as not being satisfied with treatment for substance abuse programs. Many lesbian communities are centered in bars, and drinking is an activity that correlates to community participation for lesbians and bisexual women.

Media representation

Lesbians portrayed in literature, film, and television often shape contemporary thought about women's sexuality. The majority of media about lesbians is produced by men; women's publishing companies did not develop until the 1970s, films about lesbians made by women did not appear until the 1980s, and television shows portraying lesbians written by women only began to be created in the 21st century. As a result, homosexuality—particularly dealing with women—has been excluded because of symbolic annihilation. When depictions of lesbians began to surface, they were often one-dimensional, simplified stereotypes.

Literature

In addition to Sappho's accomplishments, literary historian Jeannette Howard Foster includes the Book of Ruth, and ancient mythological tradition as examples of lesbianism in classical literature. Greek stories of the heavens often included a female figure whose virtue and virginity were unspoiled, who pursued more masculine interests, and who was followed by a dedicated group of maidens. Foster cites Camilla and Diana, Artemis and Callisto, and Iphis and Ianthe as examples of female mythological figures who showed remarkable devotion to each other, or defied gender expectations. The Greeks are also given credit with spreading the story of a mythological race of women warriors named Amazons.

For ten centuries after the fall of the Roman Empire, lesbianism disappeared from literature. Foster points to the particularly strict view that Eve—representative of all women—caused the downfall of mankind; original sin among women was a particular concern, especially because women were perceived as creating life. During this time, women were largely illiterate and not encouraged to engage in intellectual pursuit, so men were responsible for shaping ideas about sexuality.

In the 15th and 16th centuries, French and English depictions of relationships between women (Lives of Gallant Ladies by Brantôme in 1665, John Cleland's 1749 erotica Memoirs of a Woman of Pleasure, L'Espion Anglais by various authors in 1778), writers' attitudes spanned from amused tolerance to arousal, whereupon a male character would participate to complete the act. Physical relationships between women were often encouraged; men felt no threat as they viewed sexual acts between women to be accepted when men were not available, and not comparable to fulfillment that could be achieved by sexual acts between men and women. At worst, if a woman became enamored of another woman, she became a tragic figure. Physical and therefore emotional satisfaction was considered impossible without a natural phallus. Male intervention into relationships between women was necessary only when women acted as men and demanded the same social privileges.

Lesbianism became almost exclusive to French literature in the 19th century, based on male fantasy and the desire to shock bourgeois moral values. Honoré de Balzac, in The Girl with the Golden Eyes (1835), employed lesbianism in his story about three people living amongst the moral degeneration of Paris, and again in Cousin Bette and Séraphîta. His work influenced novelist Théophile Gautier's Mademoiselle de Maupin, which provided the first description of a physical type that became associated with lesbians: tall, wide-shouldered, slim-hipped, and athletically inclined. Charles Baudelaire repeatedly used lesbianism as a theme in his poems "Lesbos", "Femmes damnées 1" ("Damned Women"), and "Femmes damnées 2".

Reflecting French society, as well as employing stock character associations, many of the lesbian characters in 19th-century French literature were prostitutes or courtesans: personifications of vice who died early, violent deaths in moral endings. Samuel Taylor Coleridge's 1816 poem "Christabel" and the novella Carmilla (1872) by Sheridan Le Fanu both present lesbianism associated with vampirism. Portrayals of female homosexuality not only formed European consciousness about lesbianism, but Krafft-Ebing cited the characters in Gustave Flaubert's Salammbô (1862) and Ernest Feydeau's Le Comte de Chalis (1867) as examples of lesbians because both novels feature female protagonists who do not adhere to social norms and express "contrary sexual feeling", although neither participated in same-sex desire or sexual behavior. Havelock Ellis used literary examples from Balzac and several French poets and writers to develop his framework to identify sexual inversion in women.

Gradually, women began to author their own thoughts and literary works about lesbian relationships. Until the publication of The Well of Loneliness, most major works involving lesbianism were penned by men. Foster suggests that women would have encountered suspicion about their own lives had they used same-sex love as a topic, and that some writers including Louise Labé, Charlotte Charke, and Margaret Fuller either changed the pronouns in their literary works to male, or made them ambiguous. Author George Sand was portrayed as a character in several works in the 19th century; writer Mario Praz credited the popularity of lesbianism as a theme to Sand's appearance in Paris society in the 1830s. Charlotte Brontë's Villette in 1853 initiated a genre of boarding school stories with homoerotic themes.

In the 20th century, Katherine Mansfield, Amy Lowell, Gertrude Stein, H.D., Vita Sackville-West, Virginia Woolf, and Gale Wilhelm wrote popular works that had same-sex relationships as themes. Some women, such as Marguerite Yourcenar and Mary Renault, wrote or translated works of fiction that focused on homosexual men, like some of the writings of Carson McCullers. All three were involved in same-sex relationships, but their primary friendships were with gay men. Foster further asserts 1928 was a "peak year" for lesbian-themed literature; in addition to The Well of Loneliness, three other novels with lesbian themes were published in England: Elizabeth Bowen's The Hotel, Woolf's Orlando, and Compton Mackenzie's satirical novel Extraordinary Women. Unlike The Well of Loneliness, none of these novels were banned.

As the paperback book came into fashion, lesbian themes were relegated to pulp fiction. Many of the pulp novels typically presented very unhappy women, or relationships that ended tragically. Marijane Meaker later wrote that she was told to make the relationship end badly in Spring Fire because the publishers were concerned about the books being confiscated by the U.S. Postal Service. Patricia Highsmith, writing as Claire Morgan, wrote The Price of Salt in 1951 and refused to follow this directive, but instead used a pseudonym.

Following the Stonewall riots, lesbian themes in literature became much more diverse and complex, and shifted the focus of lesbianism from erotica for heterosexual men to works written by and for lesbians. Feminist magazines such as The Furies, and Sinister Wisdom replaced The Ladder. Serious writers who used lesbian characters and plots included Rita Mae Brown's Rubyfruit Jungle (1973), which presents a feminist heroine who chooses to be a lesbian. Poet Audre Lorde confronts homophobia and racism in her works, and Cherríe Moraga is credited with being primarily responsible for bringing Latina perspectives to lesbian literature. Further changing values are evident in the writings of Dorothy Allison, who focuses on child sexual abuse and deliberately provocative lesbian sadomasochism themes.

Film
Lesbianism, or the suggestion of it, began early in filmmaking. The same constructs of how lesbians were portrayed—or for what reasons—as what had appeared in literature were placed on women in the films. Women challenging their feminine roles was a device more easily accepted than men challenging masculine ones. Actresses appeared as men in male roles because of plot devices as early as 1914 in A Florida Enchantment featuring Edith Storey. In Morocco (1930) Marlene Dietrich kisses another woman on the lips, and Katharine Hepburn plays a man in Christopher Strong in 1933 and again in Sylvia Scarlett (1936). Hollywood films followed the same trend set by audiences who flocked to Harlem to see edgy shows that suggested bisexuality.

Overt female homosexuality was introduced in 1929's Pandora's Box between Louise Brooks and Alice Roberts. After the Hays Code in 1930, most references to homosexuality in films were censored under the umbrella term "sex perversion". German films depicted homosexuality and were distributed throughout Europe, but 1931's Mädchen in Uniform was not distributed in the U.S. because of the depiction of an adolescent's love for a female teacher in boarding school.

Because of the Hays Code, lesbianism after 1930 was absent from most films, even those adapted with overt lesbian characters or plot devices. Lillian Hellman's play The Children's Hour was converted into a heterosexual love triangle and retitled These Three. Biopic Queen Christina in 1933, starring Greta Garbo, veiled most of the speculation about Christina of Sweden's affairs with women. Homosexuality or lesbianism was never mentioned outright in the films while the Hays Code was enforced. The reason censors stated for removing a lesbian scene in 1954's The Pit of Loneliness was that it was, "Immoral, would tend to corrupt morals". The code was relaxed somewhat after 1961, and the next year William Wyler remade The Children's Hour with Audrey Hepburn and Shirley MacLaine. After MacLaine's character admits her love for Hepburn's, she hangs herself; this set a precedent for miserable endings in films addressing homosexuality.

Gay characters also were often killed off at the end, such as the death of Sandy Dennis' character at the end of The Fox in 1968. If not victims, lesbians were depicted as villains or morally corrupt, such as portrayals of brothel madames by Barbara Stanwyck in Walk on the Wild Side from 1962 and Shelley Winters in The Balcony in 1963. Lesbians as predators were presented in Rebecca (1940), women's prison films like Caged (1950), or in the character Rosa Klebb in From Russia with Love (1963). Lesbian vampire themes have reappeared in Dracula's Daughter (1936), Blood and Roses (1960), Vampyros Lesbos (1971), and The Hunger (1983). Basic Instinct (1992) featured a bisexual murderer played by Sharon Stone; it was one of several films that set off a storm of protests about the depiction of gay people as predators.

The first film to address lesbianism with significant depth was The Killing of Sister George in 1968, which was filmed in The Gateways Club, a longstanding lesbian pub in London. It is the first to claim a film character who identifies as a lesbian, and film historian Vito Russo considers the film a complex treatment of a multifaceted character who is forced into silence about her openness by other lesbians. Personal Best in 1982, and Lianna in 1983 treat the lesbian relationships more sympathetically and show lesbian sex scenes, though in neither film are the relationships happy ones. Personal Best was criticized for engaging in the clichéd plot device of one woman returning to a relationship with a man, implying that lesbianism is a phase, as well as treating the lesbian relationship with "undisguised voyeurism". More ambiguous portrayals of lesbian characters were seen in Silkwood (1983), The Color Purple (1985), and Fried Green Tomatoes (1991), despite explicit lesbianism in the source material.

An era of independent filmmaking brought different stories, writers, and directors to films.  Desert Hearts arrived in 1985, to be one of the most successful. Directed by lesbian Donna Deitch, it is loosely based on Jane Rule's novel Desert of the Heart. It received mixed critical commentary, but earned positive reviews from the gay press. The late 1980s and early 1990s ushered in a series of films treating gay and lesbian issues seriously, made by gays and lesbians, nicknamed New Queer Cinema. Films using lesbians as a subject included Rose Troche's avant garde romantic comedy Go Fish (1994) and the first film about African American lesbians, Cheryl Dunye's The Watermelon Woman, in 1995.

Realism in films depicting lesbians developed further to include romance stories such as The Incredibly True Adventure of Two Girls in Love and When Night Is Falling, both in 1995, Better Than Chocolate (1999), and the social satire But I'm a Cheerleader (also in 1999). A twist on the lesbian-as-predator theme was the added complexity of motivations of some lesbian characters in Peter Jackson's Heavenly Creatures (1994), the Oscar-winning biopic of Aileen Wuornos, Monster (2003), and the exploration of fluid sexuality and gender in Chasing Amy (1997), Kissing Jessica Stein (2001), and Boys Don't Cry (1999). The film V for Vendetta shows a dictatorship in future Britain that forces lesbians, homosexuals, and other "unwanted" people in society to be systematically slaughtered in Nazi concentration camps. In the film, a lesbian actress named Valerie, who was killed in such a manner, serves as inspiration for the masked rebel V and his ally Evey Hammond, who set out to overthrow the dictatorship.

Theatre 
The first stage production to feature a lesbian kiss and open depiction of two women in love is the 1907 Yiddish play God of Vengeance (Got fun nekome) by Sholem Asch. Rivkele, a young woman, and Manke, a prostitute in her father's brothel, fall in love. On March 6, 1923, during a performance of the play in a New York City theatre, producers and cast were informed that they had been indicted by a Grand Jury for violating the Penal Code that defined the presentation of "an obscene, indecent, immoral and impure theatrical production." They were arrested the following day when they appeared before a judge. Two months later, they were found guilty in a jury trial. The producers were fined $200 and the cast received suspended sentences. The play is considered by some to be "the greatest drama of the Yiddish theater".  God of Vengeance was the inspiration for the 2015 play Indecent by Paula Vogel, which features lesbian characters Rifkele and Manke. Indecent was nominated for the 2017 Tony Award for Best Play and Drama Desk Award for Outstanding Play.

Broadway musical The Prom featured lesbian characters Emma Nolan and Alyssa Greene. In 2019, the production was nominated for six Tony Awards, including Best Musical, and received the Drama Desk Award for Outstanding Musical. A performance from The Prom was included in the 2018 Macy's Thanksgiving Day Parade and made history by showing the first same-sex kiss in the parade's broadcast. Jagged Little Pill featured lesbian character Jo, who is dealing with her religious mother's disapproval.

Television

Television began to address homosexuality much later than film. Local talk shows in the late 1950s first addressed homosexuality by inviting panels of experts (usually not gay themselves) to discuss the problems of gay men in society. Lesbianism was rarely included. The first time a lesbian was portrayed on network television was the NBC drama The Eleventh Hour in the early 1960s, in a teleplay about an actress who feels she is persecuted by her female director, and in distress, calls a psychiatrist who explains she is a latent lesbian who has deep-rooted guilt about her feelings for women. When she realizes this, she is able to pursue heterosexual relationships, which are portrayed as "healthy".

Invisibility for lesbians continued in the 1970s when homosexuality became the subject of dramatic portrayals, first with medical dramas (The Bold Ones, Marcus Welby, M.D., Medical Center) featuring primarily male patients coming out to doctors, or staff members coming out to other staff members. These shows allowed homosexuality to be discussed clinically, with the main characters guiding troubled gay characters or correcting homophobic antagonists, while simultaneously comparing homosexuality to psychosis, criminal behavior, or drug use.

Another stock plot device in the 1970s was the gay character in a police drama. They served as victims of blackmail or anti-gay violence, but more often as criminals. Beginning in the late 1960s with N.Y.P.D., Police Story, and Police Woman, the use of homosexuals in stories became much more prevalent, according to Vito Russo, as a response to their higher profiles in gay activism. Lesbians were included as villains, motivated to murder by their desires, internalized homophobia, or fear of being exposed as homosexual. One episode of Police Woman earned protests by the National Gay Task Force before it aired for portraying a trio of murderous lesbians who killed retirement home patients for their money. NBC edited the episode because of the protests, but a sit-in was staged in the head of NBC's offices.

In the middle of the 1970s, gay men and lesbians began to appear as police officers or detectives facing coming out issues. This did not extend to CBS' groundbreaking show Cagney & Lacey in 1982, starring two female police detectives. CBS production made conscious attempts to soften the characters so they would not appear to be lesbians. In 1991, a bisexual lawyer portrayed by Amanda Donohoe on L.A. Law shared the first significant lesbian kiss on primetime television with Michele Greene, stirring a controversy despite being labeled "chaste" by The Hollywood Reporter.

Though television did not begin to use recurring homosexual characters until the late 1980s, some early situation comedies used a stock character that author Stephen Tropiano calls "gay-straight": supporting characters who were quirky, did not comply with gender norms, or had ambiguous personal lives, that "for all purposes should be gay". These included Zelda from The Many Loves of Dobie Gillis, Miss Hathaway from The Beverly Hillbillies, and Jo from The Facts of Life. In the mid-1980s through the 1990s, sitcoms frequently employed a "coming out" episode, where a friend of one of the stars admits she is a lesbian, forcing the cast to deal with the issue. Designing Women, The Golden Girls, and Friends used this device with women in particular.

Recurring lesbian characters who came out were seen on Married... with Children, Mad About You, and Roseanne, in which a highly publicized episode had ABC executives afraid a televised kiss between Roseanne and Mariel Hemingway would destroy ratings and ruin advertising. The episode was instead the week's highest rated. By far the sitcom with the most significant impact to the image of lesbians was Ellen. Publicity surrounding Ellen's coming out episode in 1997 was enormous; Ellen DeGeneres appeared on the cover of Time magazine the week before the airing of "The Puppy Episode" with the headline "Yep, I'm Gay". Parties were held in many U.S. cities to watch the episode, and the opposition from conservative organizations was intense. WBMA-LP, the ABC affiliate in Birmingham, Alabama, even refused to air the first run of the episode, citing conservative values of the local viewing audience, which earned the station some infamy and ire in the LGBT community. Even still, "The Puppy Episode" won an Emmy for writing, but as the show began to deal with Ellen Morgan's sexuality each week, network executives grew uncomfortable with the direction the show took and canceled it.

Dramas following L.A. Law began incorporating homosexual themes, particularly with continuing storylines on Relativity, Picket Fences, ER, and Star Trek: The Next Generation and Deep Space Nine, both of which tested the boundaries of sexuality and gender. A show directed at adolescents that had a particularly strong cult following was Buffy the Vampire Slayer. In the fourth season of Buffy, Tara and Willow admit their love for each other without any special fanfare and the relationship is treated as are the other romantic relationships on the show.

What followed was a series devoted solely to gay characters from network television. Showtime's American rendition of Queer as Folk ran for five years, from 2000 to 2005; two of the main characters were a lesbian couple. Showtime promoted the series as "No Limits", and Queer as Folk addressed homosexuality graphically. The aggressive advertising paid off as the show became the network's highest rated, doubling the numbers of other Showtime programs after the first season. In 2004, Showtime introduced The L Word, a dramatic series devoted to a group of lesbian and bisexual women, running its final season in 2009.

Chic and popular culture

Lesbian visibility has improved since the early 1980s. This is in part due to public figures who have drawn speculation from the public and comment in the press about their sexuality and lesbianism in general. The primary figure earning this attention was Martina Navratilova, who served as tabloid fodder for years as she denied being lesbian, admitted to being bisexual, had very public relationships with Rita Mae Brown and Judy Nelson, and acquired as much press about her sexuality as she did her athletic achievements. Navratilova spurred what scholar Diane Hamer termed "constant preoccupation" in the press with determining the root of same-sex desire.

Other public figures acknowledged their homosexuality and bisexuality, notably musicians k.d. lang and Melissa Etheridge, and Madonna's pushing of sexual boundaries in her performances and publications. In 1993, lang and self-professed heterosexual supermodel Cindy Crawford posed for the August cover of Vanity Fair in a provocative arrangement that showed Crawford shaving lang's face, as lang lounged in a barber's chair wearing a pinstripe suit. The image "became an internationally recognized symbol of the phenomenon of lesbian chic", according to Hamer. The year 1994 marked a rise in lesbian visibility, particularly appealing to women with feminine appearances. Between 1992 and 1994, Mademoiselle, Vogue, Cosmopolitan, Glamour, Newsweek, and New York magazines featured stories about women who admitted sexual histories with other women.

One analyst reasoned the recurrence of lesbian chic was due to the often-used homoerotic subtexts of gay male subculture being considered off-limits because of AIDS in the late 1980s and 1990s, joined with the distant memory of lesbians as they appeared in the 1970s: unattractive and militant. In short, lesbians became more attractive to general audiences when they ceased having political convictions. All the attention on feminine and glamorous women created what culture analyst Rodger Streitmatter characterizes as an unrealistic image of lesbians packaged by heterosexual men; the trend influenced an increase in the inclusion of lesbian material in pornography aimed at men.

A resurgence of lesbian visibility and sexual fluidity was noted in 2009, with celebrities such as Cynthia Nixon and Lindsay Lohan commenting openly on their relationships with women, and reality television addressing same-sex relationships. Psychiatrists and feminist philosophers write that the rise in women acknowledging same-sex relationships is due to growing social acceptance, but also concede that "only a certain kind of lesbian—slim and elegant or butch in just the right androgynous way—is acceptable to mainstream culture".

Family and politics

Although homosexuality among females has taken place in many cultures in history, a recent phenomenon is the development of family among same-sex partners. Before the 1970s, the idea that same-sex adults formed long-term committed relationships was unknown to many people. The majority of lesbians (between 60% and 80%) report being in a long-term relationship. Sociologists credit the high number of paired women to gender role socialization: the inclination for women to commit to relationships doubles in a lesbian union. Unlike heterosexual relationships that tend to divide work based on sex roles, lesbian relationships divide chores evenly between both members. Studies have also reported that emotional bonds are closer in lesbian and gay relationships than heterosexual ones.

Family issues were significant concerns for lesbians when gay activism became more vocal in the 1960s and 1970s. Custody issues in particular were of interest since often courts would not award custody to mothers who were openly homosexual, even though the general procedure acknowledged children were awarded to the biological mother. Several studies performed as a result of custody disputes viewed how children grow up with same-sex parents compared to single mothers who did not identify as lesbians. They found that children's mental health, happiness, and overall adjustment is similar to children of divorced women who are not lesbians. Sexual orientation, gender identity, and sex roles of children who grow up with lesbian mothers are unaffected. Differences that were found include the fact that divorced lesbians tend to be living with a partner, fathers visit divorced lesbian mothers more often than divorced nonlesbian mothers, and lesbian mothers report a greater fear of losing their children through legal means.

Improving opportunities for growing families of same-sex couples has shaped the political landscape within the past ten years. A push for same-sex marriage or civil unions in western countries has replaced other political objectives. , ten countries and six U.S. states offer same-sex marriage; civil unions are offered as an option in some European countries, U.S. states and individual municipalities. The ability to adopt domestically or internationally children or provide a home as a foster parent is also a political and family priority for many lesbians, as is improving access to artificial insemination.

Lesbians of color

Lesbians of color have often been a marginalized group, including African American, Latina, Asian, Arab, and other non-white lesbians; and experienced racism in addition to homophobia and misogyny.

Some scholars have noted that in the past the predominant lesbian community was largely composed of white women and influenced by American culture, leading some lesbians of color to experience difficulties integrating into the community at large. Many lesbians of color have stated that they were often systematically excluded from lesbian spaces based on the fact that they are women of color. Additionally, these women face a unique set of challenges within their respective racial communities. Many feel abandoned, as communities of color often view homosexual identity as a "white" lifestyle and see the acceptance of homosexuality as a setback in achieving equality.

Lesbians of color, especially those of immigrant populations, often hold the sentiment that their sexual orientation identity adversely affects assimilation into the dominant culture. Historically, women of color were often excluded from participating in lesbian and gay movements. Scholars have stated that this exclusion came as a result of the majority of whites dismissing the intersections of gender, race, and sexuality that are a core part of the lesbian of color identity. Lesbians that organized events were mostly white and middle-class, and largely focused their political movements on the issues of sexism and homophobia, rather than class or race issues. The early lesbian feminist movement was criticized for excluding race and class issues from their spaces and for a lack of focus on issues that did not benefit white women. Audre Lorde, Barbara Smith, and Cherrie Moraga are cited as major theorists within the various lesbians of color movements for their insistence on inclusion and equality, from both racial communities and white lesbian communities.

The many intersections surrounding lesbians of color can often contribute to an increased need for mental health resources. Lesbians of color are more likely to experience a number of psychological issues due to the various experiences of sexism, racism, and homophobia as a part of their existence. Mental health providers, such as therapists, often use heteronormative standards to gauge the health of lesbian relationships, and the relationships of lesbian women of color are often subjects of judgment because they are seen as the most deviant.

Within racial communities, the decision to come out can be costly, as the threat of loss of support from family, friends, and the community at large is probable. Lesbians of color are often exposed to a range of adverse consequences, including microaggression, discrimination, menace, and violence.

See also

 Dyke (slang)
 Dyke March
 History of lesbianism
 History of lesbianism in the United States
 Homosexual behavior in animals
 Lesbian bar
 Lesbian erasure
 Lesbian literature
 Lesbian science fiction
 Lesbian Visibility Week
 Lesbianism in erotica
 Lesbophobia
 Lipstick lesbian
 List of lesbian periodicals
 Women's music
 Yuri (genre)

Notes

References

Parenthetical sources

 Adam, Barry (1987). The Rise of a Gay and Lesbian Movement, G. K. Hall & Co. 
 Aldrich, Robert, ed. (2006). Gay Life and Culture: A World History, Thames & Hudson, Ltd. 
 Barnes, Djuna. With an introduction by Susan Sniader Lanser. (1992). Ladies Almanack, New York University Press. 
 Berube, Allan (1990). Coming Out Under Fire: The History of Gay Men and Women in World War II, The Free Press. 
 Bremmer, Jan (ed.) (1989). From Sappho to de Sade: Moments in the History of Sexuality, Routledge. 
 Brenshoff, Harry, Griffin, Sean (2006). Queer Images: A History of Gay and Lesbian Film in America, Rowman & Littlefield Publishers, Inc. 
 Castle, Terry, ed. (2003). The Literature of Lesbianism: A Historical Anthology from Ariosto to Stonewall, Columbia University Press. 
 Doan, Laura (2001). Fashioning Sapphism: The Origins of a Modern English Lesbian Culture, Columbia University Press. 
 Edsall, Nicholas (2003). Toward Stonewall: Homosexuality and Society in the Modern Western World, University of Virginia Press. 
 Faderman, Lillian (1981). Surpassing the Love of Men: Romantic Friendship and Love Between Women from the Renaissance to the Present, Quill. 
 
 Foster, Jeannette H. (1956). Sex Variant Women in Literature, Naiad Press edition, 1985. 
 Gallo, Marcia (2006). Different Daughters: A History of the Daughters of Bilitis and the Rise of the Lesbian Rights Movement, Seal Press. 
 Hamer, Diane, Budge, Belinda, eds. (1994). The Good, The Bad, and the Gorgeous: Popular Culture's Romance with Lesbianism, Pandora. 
 Hite, Shere (1976). The Hite Report: A Nationwide Study on Female Sexuality , MacMillan. 
 Holmes, King, Sparling, P., et al., eds. (2008). Sexually Transmitted Diseases, McGraw-Hill Medical. 
 Institute for Sex Research (Kinsey, et al.) (1953). Sexual Behavior in the Human Female, Saunders.
 Jennings, Rebecca (2007). A Lesbian History of Britain, Greenwood World Publishing. 
 Katz, Jonathan (1976). Gay American History: Lesbians and Gay Men in the U.S.A. Thomas Y. Crowell Company. 
 Martin, Del, Lyon, Phyllis (1991). Lesbian / Woman, Volcano Press. 
 McCormick, Noami (1994). Sexual Salvation: Affirming Women's Sexual Rights and Pleasures, Praeger Publishers. 
 Mogrovejo, Norma (2004). "Relevancia de las lesbianas en América Latina: la recuperación de nuestra historia". In Drucker, Péter; Mercad, Enrique (in Spanish). Arco iris diferentes. Siglo XXI. .
 Murray, Stephen O. and Roscoe, Will (1997). Islamic Homosexualities: Culture, History and Literature, New York University Press. 
 Norton, Rictor (1997). The Myth of the Modern Homosexual: Queer History and the Search for Cultural Unity, Cassell. 
 Rabinowitz, Nancy, Auanger, Lisa, eds. (2002). Among Women: From the Homosocial to the Homoerotic in the Ancient World, University of Texas Press. 
 Rachid, María (2000). "Encuentros de lesbianas". In George Haggerty & Bonnie Zimmerman (Eds.), Encyclopedia of lesbian and gay histories and cultures. Taylor & Francis. 
 Rothblum, Esther, Brehoney, Kathleen, eds. (1993). Boston Marriages: Romantic But Asexual Relationships Among Contemporary Lesbians, University of Massachusetts Press. 
 Russo, Vito (1987). The Celluloid Closet: Homosexuality in the Movies, Harper & Row. 
 Schlager, Neil, ed. (1998). Gay & Lesbian Almanac. St. James Press. 
 Solarz, Andrea L. (ed), (1999). "Lesbian Health: Current Assessment and Directions For the Future", Committee on Lesbian Health Research Priorities, Neuroscience and Behavioral Health Program [and] Health Sciences Policy Program, Health Sciences Section, Institute of Medicine. 
 Streitmatter, Rodger (2009). From 'Perverts' to 'Fab Five': The Media's Changing Depiction of Gay Men and Lesbians, Routledge. 
 Stryker, Susan (2001). Queer Pulp: Perverted Passions from the Golden Age of the Paperback, Chronicle Books, LLC. 
 Sullivan, Gerard, Jackson, Peter, eds. (2001). Gay and Lesbian Asia: Culture, Identity, Community, Harrington Park Press. 
 Tamagne, Florence (2004). A History of Homosexuality in Europe Berlin, London, Paris, 1919–1939: Volume 1, Algora. 
 Tropiano, Stephen (2002). Prime Time Closet: A History of Gays and Lesbians on TV, Applause Theater and Cinema Books. 
(2005). Same-Sex Desire and Love in Greco-Roman Antiquity and In the Classical Tradition of the West, Harrington Park Press. 
 Warner, Tom (2002). Never Going Back: A History of Queer Activism in Canada, University of Toronto Press. 
 Willett, Graham (2000). Living Out Loud: A History of Gay and Lesbian Activism in Australia, Allen & Unwin. 
 Zimet, Jaye (1999). Strange Sisters: The Art of Lesbian Pulp Fiction, 1949–1969, Viking Studio.

Further reading

 
 
 
 
 
 
 
 
 
 
 
 
 
 
 
 
 
 

Books and journals

 
 
 
 
 
 
 
 
 
 
 
 
 
 
 
  (Original U.S. copyright is 2003.)
 
 

Audio

External links

 Lesbian Archive at Glasgow Women's Library
 Bay Area Lesbian Archives
 June L. Mazer Lesbian Archives
 Lesbian Herstory Archives
 Lesbians in the Twentieth Century, 1900–1999, Esther Newton, OutHistory, 2008 (Lesbian History project, University of Michigan)
 Lesbian at Curlie
 Lesbian Media
 Lesbians Over Everything
 Oral Herstorians Collection at Sinister Wisdom
 Dyke, A Quarterly, published 1975–1979 (online annotated archive, live website)
 Vintage Images, Isle of Lesbos (Sappho.com)
 U.S. Homosexuality – Statistics & Facts, Statista, 2017

 
 
Homosexuality
Sexual orientation